The 2021 Cooper Tires World RX of Montalegre was the seventh round of the eighth season of the FIA World Rallycross Championship. The event was held at the Pista Automóvel de Montalegre in Montalegre, Vila Real.

World RX1 Championship 

Source

Heats

Semi-finals 

 Semi-Final 1

 Semi-Final 2

Final

Standings after the event 

Source

 Note: Only the top six positions are included.

References 

|- style="text-align:center"
|width="35%"|Previous race:2021 World RX of Benelux
|width="40%"|FIA World Rallycross Championship2021 season
|width="35%"|Next race:2021 World RX of Germany
|- style="text-align:center"
|width="35%"|Previous race:2018 World RX of Portugal
|width="40%"|World RX of Portugal
|width="35%"|Next race:2022 World RX of Portugal
|- style="text-align:center"

Portugal
World RX
World RX